Flight director may refer to:

 Flight controller, a person who aids in the operations of a space flight
 Flight controller#Flight director, a position in a flight control team
 Flight director (aeronautics), a navigational aid that is overlaid on the attitude indicator that shows the pilot of an aircraft the attitude required to follow a certain trajectory

See also
 flight controller (disambiguation)